Palooka is a 1934 American Pre-Code comedy film directed by Benjamin Stoloff and starring Stuart Erwin in the titular role, Lupe Velez and Jimmy Durante, and based on the comic strip by Ham Fisher. The film was adapted by Jack Jevne, Arthur Kober, Gertrude Purcell, Murray Roth and Ben Ryan from the comic strip. The film is also known as The Great Schnozzle in the United Kingdom.

Plot
Joe Palooka (Stuart Erwin) is a naive young man whose father Pete (Robert Armstrong) was a champion boxer, but his lifestyle caused Joe's mother Mayme (Marjorie Rambeau) to leave him and to take young Joe to the country to raise him. But when a shady boxing manager (Jimmy Durante) discovers Joe's natural boxing talent, Joe decides to follow him to the big city, where he becomes a champion and begins to follow his father's path of debauchery, much of it including the glamorous cabaret singer and fortune hunter Nina Madero (Lupe Vélez). The film also stars William Cagney, the younger brother of actor James Cagney in the role of the adversary prize fighter to Knobby. Finally his mother comes to the city to look after things...

Cast 
Jimmy Durante as Knobby Walsh / Junior
Lupe Vélez as Nina Madero
Stuart Erwin as Joe Palooka
Marjorie Rambeau as Mayme Palooka
Robert Armstrong as Pete 'Goodtime' Palooka
Mary Carlisle as Anne
Thelma Todd as Trixie
Gus Arnheim as Orchestra Bandleader
Franklyn Ardell as Doc Wise
Tom Dugan as Whitey, Joe's Trainer
Louise Beavers as Crystal – Mayme's Housekeeper
Fred 'Snowflake' Toones as Smokey
William Cagney, brother of James Cagney as Al McSwatt
Rolfe Sedan as Alphonse

Production 
The film was the second movie Edward Small made under an agreement with United Artists. Small bought the rights to the song "Inka Dinka Doo" specifically for the movie.

Soundtrack 
 "The Band Played On" (music by Charles B. Ward, lyrics by John F. Palmer)
 Lupe Vélez - "Like Me a Little Bit Less (Love Me a Little Bit More)" (music by Burton Lane, lyrics by Harold Adamson)
 Jimmy Durante - "Inka Dinka Doo" (written by Jimmy Durante and Ben Ryan)
 Jimmy Durante - "M-O-T-H-E-R, a Word That Means the World To Me" (music by Theodore Morse, lyrics by Howard Johnson)
 "Count Your Blessings" (written by Irving Caesar, Ferde Grofé Sr. and Edgar A. Guest)
 "Palooka, It's a Grand Old Name" (music by Joseph Burke, lyrics by Ann Ronell)

References

External links

1934 films
1930s sports comedy films
American sports comedy films
1930s English-language films
American black-and-white films
American boxing films
Films directed by Benjamin Stoloff
Films based on American comics
Live-action films based on comics
Films produced by Edward Small
1934 comedy films
1930s American films
Joe Palooka films